The 1869 Chester by-election was contested on 4 December 1869 due to the incumbent Liberal MP, Hugh Grosvenor, succeeding to the peerage as Marquess of Westminster. It was retained by the Liberal candidate Norman de L'Aigle Grosvenor, who was unopposed.

References

1869 elections in the United Kingdom
1869 in England
19th century in Cheshire
History of Chester
By-elections to the Parliament of the United Kingdom in Cheshire constituencies
Unopposed by-elections to the Parliament of the United Kingdom in English constituencies
December 1869 events